Khadga Bahadur Bishwakarma alias Prakanda (प्रकाण्ड), born 17 May 1968 (२०२५ जेष्ठ ४ शुक्रवार), is a Nepalese communist politician, belonging to  Communist Party of Nepal, led by Netra Bikram Chand “Biplav”. He is a member of the standing committee and spokesperson of Communist Party of Nepal.

In the 2008 Constituent Assembly election he was elected from Kalikot 1 constituency, winning 27629 votes. He was subsequently appointed as Minister of Tourism and civil aviation in the Cabinet headed by Mr. Jhalanath Khanal. Before that, in 2007 he was appointed  as Minister of Women, Children and Social Welfare in the cabinet headed by late Girija Prasad Koirala.

Vishwakarma was born in ward no 4 of Malkot VDC of Kalikot district in a low-middle class peasant family. He played vital role in western part of Nepal in 10-years-long (1996-2006 AD) guerrilla war (Peoples war) led by Communist Party of Nepal (Maoist) against the feudal monarchy political system. Which subsequently overthrown the 240 years long feudal monarchy and established republican system in Nepal.

References

Living people
Nepalese atheists
1968 births
People from Kalikot District
People of the Nepalese Civil War
Khas people

Members of the 1st Nepalese Constituent Assembly